Scott McCurley is the current linebackers coach for the Dallas Cowboys of the National Football League (NFL).

Biography
Born in New Castle, Pennsylvania, McCurley graduated from Mohawk High school in Bessemer, Pennsylvania and attended the University of Pittsburgh. He is married to Colleen (Crisi) McCurley and has two children. They reside in Celina, Texas.

Playing career
During college McCurley played linebacker with the Pittsburgh Panthers football team. Following graduation he remained with the program as a defensive graduate assistant.

Coaching career
McCurley originally joined the Packers in 2006 as an intern before being named Coaching Administrator the following year. He was hired to his current position on February 3, 2009.  On February 10, 2014, it was announced that McCurley was promoted to linebackers coach of the Packers.  After the departure of Kevin Greene as outside linebackers coach, it was announced that Winston Moss would take over as coach of both the inside and outside linebackers, and McCurley will assist in whichever area he is needed. In 2020 he joined the Dallas Cowboys as the team’s linebackers coach.

References

People from New Castle, Pennsylvania
Dallas Cowboys coaches
Green Bay Packers coaches
Pittsburgh Panthers football coaches
Pittsburgh Panthers football players
University of Pittsburgh alumni
Living people
Players of American football from Pennsylvania
People from De Pere, Wisconsin
Year of birth missing (living people)